The First Church of Christ, Scientist at 339 West Kaufman in Paris, Texas, is a former Church of Christ, Scientist church and an historic structure that, in 1988, was added to the National Register of Historic Places. It was then vacant. In 2009 it was being used by a Spanish-speaking Baptist congregation.

It is a one-story raised brick building, with broad steps leading up to a portico of Ionic columns and a large entablature.  It has double French doors with transoms leading to its sanctuary.  The sides have three tall arched windows.

Its nomination suggests it is significant as "one of the earlier Christian Science churches in Texas" and as "one of the first Beaux Arts-style buildings constructed in Paris, Texas after the fire [of 1916], it is an unusually well-detailed small church. It compares favorably with Temple Freda (NR 1984) in Bryan, Brazos County, Texas."

A photo taken in Winter 1984/85 shows that a banner displaying "Ensign Christian Center" appears in the entablature above its front entrance, while the 2015 photo above shows a blank banner obscuring carved letters after "FIR....".

See also

National Register of Historic Places listings in Lamar County, Texas
List of former Christian Science churches, societies and buildings
First Church of Christ, Scientist (disambiguation)

References

External links
National Register listing
Flickr photo

Churches in Lamar County, Texas
Churches completed in 1917
20th-century Christian Science church buildings
Churches on the National Register of Historic Places in Texas
Former Christian Science churches, societies and buildings in the United States
Baptist churches in Texas
Paris, Texas
National Register of Historic Places in Lamar County, Texas